Fissurina is a genus of lichenized fungi in the family Graphidaceae. The genus was first described by the French botanist Antoine Laurent Apollinaire Fée in an 1825 publication.

Species

Fissurina abdita 
Fissurina adscribens 
Fissurina aggregatula 
Fissurina albocinerea 
Fissurina albolabiata 
Fissurina albonitens 
Fissurina alligatorensis 
Fissurina amazonica 
Fissurina americana 
Fissurina amyloidea 
Fissurina analphabetica 
Fissurina andamanensis 
Fissurina aperta 
Fissurina astroisidiata 
Fissurina atlantica 
Fissurina aurantiacolirellata 
Fissurina aurantiacostellata 
Fissurina baishanzuensis 
Fissurina batavana 
Fissurina bullata 
Fissurina capsulata 
Fissurina carassensis 
Fissurina chapsoides 
Fissurina chrysocarpa 
Fissurina chrysocarpoides 
Fissurina cinereodisca 
Fissurina cingalina 
Fissurina coarctata 
Fissurina columbina 
Fissurina comparilis 
Fissurina comparimuralis 
Fissurina confusa 
Fissurina crystallifera 
Fissurina cypressi 
Fissurina disposita 
Fissurina dumastii 
Fissurina dumastioides 
Fissurina duplicans 
Fissurina duplomarginata 
Fissurina elaiocarpa 
Fissurina elixii 
Fissurina evanida 
Fissurina flavicans 
Fissurina flavomedullosa 
Fissurina fujisanensis 
Fissurina furfuracea 
Fissurina fuscoalba 
Fissurina gigas 
Fissurina glauca 
Fissurina globulifica 
Fissurina hemithecioides 
Fissurina homichlodes 
Fissurina howeana 
Fissurina humilis 
Fissurina ilicicola 
Fissurina illiterata 
Fissurina immersa 
Fissurina inabensis 
Fissurina incisura 
Fissurina indica 
Fissurina insidiosa 
Fissurina inspersa 
Fissurina intercludens 
Fissurina isidiata 
Fissurina jaliscoensis 
Fissurina karnatakensis 
Fissurina khasiana 
Fissurina linoana 
Fissurina longiisidiata 
Fissurina longiramea 
Fissurina lumbschiana 
Fissurina macrospora 
Fissurina mexicana 
Fissurina microcarpa 
Fissurina micromma 
Fissurina monilifera 
Fissurina nicobarensis 
Fissurina nigrolabiata 
Fissurina niveoalba 
Fissurina paradoxica 
Fissurina parvicarpa 
Fissurina phuluangii 
Fissurina platythecioides 
Fissurina praetermissa 
Fissurina pseudostromatica 
Fissurina psoromica 
Fissurina redingerioides 
Fissurina reticulata 
Fissurina rubiginosa 
Fissurina rufula 
Fissurina scolecitis 
Fissurina seychellensis 
Fissurina shivamoggensis 
Fissurina simplex 
Fissurina simulans 
Fissurina sporolata 
Fissurina srilankensis 
Fissurina stegoboloides 
Fissurina streimannii 
Fissurina stromatoides 
Fissurina subcomparimuralis 
Fissurina subcontexta 
Fissurina subcorallina 
Fissurina subfurfuracea 
Fissurina submonospora 
Fissurina subnitidula 
Fissurina subtropica 
Fissurina subundulata 
Fissurina tachygrapha 
Fissurina taeniocarpoides 
Fissurina tenuimarginata 
Fissurina triticea 
Fissurina tuberculifera 
Fissurina tuckermaniana 
Fissurina undulata 
Fissurina varieseptata 
Fissurina verrucosa 
Fissurina virensica 
Fissurina vorax 
Fissurina zahlbruckneriana

References

Ostropales
Lichen genera
Ostropales genera
Taxa named by Antoine Laurent Apollinaire Fée
Taxa described in 1825